Erich Hohagen (9 January 1915 – 8 March 1990) was a German general in the Bundeswehr. During World War II, he served as a fighter pilot in the Luftwaffe. A fighter ace, Hohagen was credited with 56 aerial victories and was a recipient of the Knight's Cross of the Iron Cross, the highest award in the military and paramilitary forces of Nazi Germany during World War II.

Career
Hohagen claimed his first aerial victory, a Royal Air Force (RAF) Supermarine Spitfire over Southern England, on 5 July 1940. On 20 February 1941, Hohagen was appointed Staffelkapitän (squadron leader) of 4. Staffel of Jagdgeschwader 51 (JG 51—51st Fighter Wing). He succeeded Oberleutnant Josef Fözö who was promoted to command II. Gruppe of JG 51.

Operation Barbarossa
II. Gruppe of JG 51 was withdrawn from the English Channel in early June 1941 and ordered to Dortmund where the unit was reequipped with the Messerschmitt Bf 109 F series. On 10 June, II. Gruppe began transferring east and was located at Siedlce. On 22 June, German forces launched Operation Barbarossa, the German invasion of the Soviet Union. JG 51, under the command of Oberstleutnant Werner Mölders, was subordinated to II. Fliegerkorps (2nd Air Corps), which as part of Luftflotte 2 (Air Fleet 2). JG 51 area of operation during Operation Barbarossa was over the right flank of Army Group Center in the combat area of the 2nd Panzer Group as well as the 4th Army.

On the first day of the invasion, Hohagen shot down three Soviet SB-2 bombers in the space of five minutes. In August, he was given command of II. Gruppe after its former acting commander Hauptmann Hubertus von Bonin was wounded on 8 August. On 4 September, Hohagen was shot down in his Messerschmitt Bf 109 F-2 (Werknummer 9211—factory number) by Soviet fighters near Bryansk. Wounded, he transferred command of II. Gruppe to Oberleutnant Hartmann Grasser. Hohagen received the Knight's Cross of the Iron Cross on 5 October 1941, after 30 victories. 

In January 1943, Hohagen was posted to Jagdgeschwader 2 "Richthofen" (JG 2—2nd Fighter Wing), taking command of its 2. Staffel. The Staffel was subordinated to III. Gruppe of JG 2 headed by Hauptmann Egon Mayer. On 7 April, Hohagen was transferred to Jagdgeschwader 27 (JG 27—27th Fighter Wing) where he was appointed Gruppenkommandeur (group commander) of I. Gruppe. He succeeded Hauptmann Hans-Joachim Heinecke who temporarily led the Gruppe after Hauptmann Heinrich Setz had been killed in action on 13 March. He successfully bailed out, taking to his parachute, but was injured in the incident. The pilot that shot him down was Hauptmann Wilhelm Steinmann, also from JG 27, who misidentified Hohagen's Bf 109 for a Spitfire fighter.

Hohagen was appointed Gruppenkommandeur of I. Gruppe of JG 2 in August 1943. He replaced Major Helmut-Felix Bolz who was transferred. On 16 September 1943, Hohagen, was piloting an Focke Wulf Fw 190 A-6 fighter (Werknummer 550532) when his aircraft was hit by the defensive fire of a Boeing B-17 Flying Fortress bomber. Hohagen was again wounded and made a forced landing near Rennes, France. On 28 September 1944, Hohagen was severely injured, sustaining a skull fracture, when the engine of his Fw 190 A-8 (Werknummer 171559) failed, resulting in another forced landing. He was succeeded by Major Walter Matoni as commander of I. Gruppe.

Flying the Messerschmitt Me 262
In late 1944, Hohagen was posted to III. Gruppe of Ergänzungs-Jagdgeschwader 2 (EJG 2—2nd Supplementary Training Wing), a training unit based at Lechfeld Airfiled. There, he learned to fly the new Messerschmitt Me 262 jet aircraft. He was then posted to Jagdgeschwader 7 "Nowotny" (JG 7—7th Fighter Wing) "Nowotny", the first operational jet fighter wing which was named after Walter Nowotny. Kommando Nowotny had been assessing the Me 262 under operational conditions. Nowotny himself was killed in action while flying the Me 262 on 8 November. On 12 November, the Oberkommando der Luftwaffe (OKL—Air Force High Command) ordered JG 7 to be equipped with the Me 262 and Oberst Johannes Steinhoff became its first Geschwaderkommodore (wing commander). On 19 November, the remnants of Kommando Nowotny became the nucleus of III. Gruppe of JG 7. Placed under the command of Hohagen, III. Gruppe began assembling aircraft and personnel at Lechfeld Air Field. In the latter months of 1944 Hohagen helped to convert pilots to the new jets. On 21 January, Steinhoff was replaced by Major Theodor Weissenberger as Geschwaderkommodore of JG 7, while Hohagen was replaced by Major Rudolf Sinner as Gruppenkommandeur of III. Gruppe.

On 24 February 1945, Generalleutnant Adolf Galland and Steinhoff recruited Hohagen and Major Karl-Heinz Schnell from hospital to join the new Jagdverband 44 (JV 44—44th Fighter Detachment) forming at Brandenburg-Briest. Galland had received permission to create and staff the unorthodox fighter group from Luftwaffe Chief, Reichsmarschall Hermann Göring. JV 44 received its first Me 262 aircraft by 14 March. On 31 March, JV 44 moved to Munich-Riem Airfield.

Hohagen became the Technical Officer for JV 44 and assisted with the conversion of newly arriving pilots to the Me 262. The unit transferred to München-Riem on 31 March 1945. 
He served as JV 44's Technical Officer until the crash of Steinhoff on 18 April 1945, and Hohagen replaced the injured Steinhoff as the unit's Einsatzchef (Operations Chief).

On 28 April, moved to JV 44 Maxglan Airfiel, near Salzburg. There they surrendered to U.S. forces on 4 May. Hohagen and other pilots were taken to a makeshift prisoner of war camp near Bad Aibling. Five days later, a U.S. officer was looking for JV 44 pilots and Hohagen, Schnell, Gerhard Barkhorn, Walter Krupinski, and Waldemar Wübke stepped up.

Later life and service
Following World War II, Hohagen joined the newly created German Air Force, at the time referred to as the Bundesluftwaffe. On 30 March 1957, he was given command of 2. He led this training unit until 31 March 1958. From November 1959 to October 1961, he commanded Jagdgeschwader 72 as Geschwaderkommodore, a unit which in October 1964 became Jagdbombergeschwader 43 (JaboG 43—43rd Fighter Bomber Wing). He was succeeded by Oberstleutnant Friedrich Obleser in this capacity. He served in the role until 15 August 1967 when he was succeeded by Oberst Ulrich Pieper. In April 1968, Hohagen was promoted to Brigadegeneral (brigadier general). He died on 8 March 1990 in Jever.

Summary of career

Aerial victory claims
According to US historian David T. Zabecki, Hohagen was credited with 56 aerial victories. Obermaier also lists him with 56 aerial victories claimed in over 500 combat missions. This figure includes 20 claims on the Eastern Front, and 36 on the Western Front, 13 of them being four-engined bombers and one while flying the Me 262 jet fighter. Mathews and Foreman, authors of Luftwaffe Aces — Biographies and Victory Claims, researched the German Federal Archives and state that he claimed at least 49 aerial victories, plus two further unconfirmed claims. This number includes 20 on the Eastern Front and more than 29 on the Western Front, including at least eight four-engined bombers.

Victory claims were logged to a map-reference (PQ = Planquadrat), for example "PQ 14 West 3884". These sectors were then subdivided into 36 smaller units to give a location area 3 × 4 km in size.

Awards
 Iron Cross (1939) 2nd and 1st Class
 Knight's Cross of the Iron Cross on 5 October 1941 as Oberleutnant and Staffelkapitän of the 4./Jagdgeschwader 51
 German Cross in Gold on 25 December 1943 as Hauptmann in the II./Jagdgeschwader 51.

Notes

References

Citations

Bibliography

 
 
 
 
 
 
 
 
 
 
 
 
 
 
 
 
 
 
 
 

1915 births
1990 deaths
Luftwaffe pilots
German World War II flying aces
People from the Rhine Province
Recipients of the Gold German Cross
Recipients of the Knight's Cross of the Iron Cross
Bundeswehr generals
Brigadier generals of the German Air Force
Military personnel from North Rhine-Westphalia